Himantopterus nox is a moth in the family Himantopteridae. It was described by Hering in 1937. It is found in India (Assam).

References

Moths described in 1937
Himantopteridae